Argjend Mustafa (born 22 October 1993) is a Kosovar-Albanian footballer who plays for FC Llapi.

Club career
He had a half season abroad with Skënderbeu in the Albanian Superliga.

Career statistics

Club

References

External links
 

1993 births
Living people
People from Suva Reka
Association football midfielders
Kosovan footballers
KF Trepça players
KF Trepça'89 players
KF Skënderbeu Korçë players
FC Prishtina players
KF Llapi players
Football Superleague of Kosovo players
Kategoria Superiore players
Kosovan expatriate footballers
Expatriate footballers in Albania
Kosovan expatriate sportspeople in Albania